Tobor may refer to:

Fictional characters

Film, television and comics 
 Tobor, a robot in the American television series Captain Video and His Video Rangers; aired 1949-1955 on DuMont Television Network
 Tobor the Great, a robot in the 1954 film with the same name, directed by Lee Sholem for Republic Pictures. The same robot also appeared in a pilot for a TV series called Here Comes Tobor
 Tobor, protagonist in the North American translation of the Japanese manga and anime series 8 Man 
 Tobor, a character in the US comic book series Sonic the Hedgehog
 Tobor, a character in the 2005 film The Adventures of Sharkboy and Lavagirl in 3-D

Video games 
 Tobor, a character in the first-person shooter game Team Fortress 2

Toys 
 Tobor (toy), a children's toy